The San Marcos Outlet Malls are two distinct outlet malls, the Premium Outlets and the Tanger Factory Outlet Center. Each is located off Interstate Highway 35 in San Marcos, Texas. The outlet mall first opened in 1977. (Verification needed.) During peak seasons, shoppers at the malls can reach numbers that effectively triple the population of San Marcos. The outlet malls in San Marcos are one of the top tourist attractions in the state. The outlet malls combined are one of the top employers of San Marcos, and are the top employers of students of nearby Texas State University.

In 2006, ABC's The View named the San Marcos Outlets the third-best place to shop in the world.

Notes

External links
Premium Outlets
Tanger Outlet Centers

Outlet malls in the United States
Buildings and structures in San Marcos, Texas
Shopping malls in Texas
Tourist attractions in Hays County, Texas